John Edward Sauer (August 31, 1925 – March 4, 1996) was an American football player, coach, and broadcaster.

A Dayton, Ohio native, Sauer was a multi-sport athlete in high school. From 1943 to 1946, he attended the United States Military Academy at West Point, where he played and coached for Army in a number of sports. Leaving the service in 1950, Sauer went into football coaching, first as an assistant with the Florida Gators football team of the University of Florida and the Los Angeles Rams, and then as head coach of the Citadel Bulldogs football team of The Citadel.

In 1957, Sauer quit full-time coaching to work in his father's real estate business, but he continued to work through the rest of the 1950s and into the 1960s as a scout for the Rams and Minnesota Vikings and an assistant offensive and defensive coordinator for the College All-Stars. In 1966-67 Sauer took over as head coach for the All-Stars, losing to Vince Lombardi's Green Bay Packers in both All-Star Games he coached.

In 1963, Sauer began working for CBS television as a color commentator on NFL and college football broadcasts. He continued with CBS until 1974. He then worked from 1974 until 1994 as a color commentator on University of Pittsburgh radio broadcasts.

He died at his home in Oakwood in 1996.

Head coaching record

References

External links

1925 births
1996 deaths
American football quarterbacks
American men's basketball players
American sports announcers
Army Black Knights baseball players
Army Black Knights football coaches
Army Black Knights football players
Army Black Knights men's basketball players
Atlanta Falcons announcers
Florida Gators football coaches
Los Angeles Rams coaches
Los Angeles Rams scouts
Minnesota Vikings scouts
Pittsburgh Panthers football announcers
Pittsburgh Steelers announcers
The Citadel Bulldogs athletic directors
The Citadel Bulldogs football coaches
Miami University alumni 
Players of American football from Dayton, Ohio
People from Oakwood, Montgomery County, Ohio